N78 may refer to:

Roads 
 N78 road (Ireland)
 Ozamiz–Pagadian Road, in the Philippines
 Nebraska Highway 78, in the United States

Other uses 
 N78 (Long Island bus)
 , a submarine of the Royal Navy
 Mangarrayi language
 Nokia N78, a smartphone